The 2001 Alberta general election was held on March 12, 2001 to elect members of the Legislative Assembly of Alberta.

The incumbent Alberta Progressive Conservative Party, led by Ralph Klein, won a strong majority for its tenth consecutive term in government. In addition to increasing its share of the popular vote to almost 62%, the PC Party won a majority of seats in Edmonton for the first time since 1982.  In the process, they reduced the opposition to only nine MLAs in total.  It was the Tories' biggest majority since the height of the Peter Lougheed era.

The Liberal Party  lost 11 seats and ran up a large debt.  Its leader, Nancy MacBeth, was defeated in her riding.

The New Democratic Party, led by Raj Pannu, hoped to make gains at the expense of the Liberals in Edmonton and replace them as the official opposition.  This did not materialize, but the party did manage to maintain its share of the popular vote and held onto their two seats in the legislature. The NDs attempted to attract young voters with the slogan, "Raj against the Machine".

The right-wing Alberta First Party, contesting its first election, failed to win any seats or come close to winning any. The Social Credit Party, led by James Albers, was unable to build on its moderate success in the 1997 election, and sank back into obscurity. Socred leader Lavern Ahlstrom, however, performed well in Rocky Mountain House and finished second behind the incumbent Ty Lund.

Results
Overall voter turnout was 53.38%.

Notes:

* Party did not nominate candidates in the previous election.

x - less than 0.005% of the popular vote.

Results by riding

|-
|Airdrie-Rocky View|||
|Carol Louise Haley13,19579.79%
|
|Carol L'Abbee2,04312.35%
|
|Christopher Hill5923.58%
|
|Tom Humble (Ind.)6834.13%|||
|Carol Louise Haley
|-
|Athabasca-Wabasca|||
|Mike Cardinal4,23866.62%
|
|Al Wurfel1,26419.87%
|
|Colin Piquette6069.53%
|
|David Klassen (SoCred)1532.41%Ian Hopfe (Green)941.48%
||
|Mike Cardinal
|-
|Banff-Cochrane|||
|Janis Tarchuk9,41869.94%
|
|Norman Kent2,14715.95%
|
|Cathy Harrop1,3119.74%
|
|Cory Morgan (Ind.)5384.00%|||
|Janis Tarchuk
|-
|Barrhead-Westlock
||
|Kenneth R. Kowalski7,18369.06%
|
|Laurie Hodge1,25912.10%
|
|Suzanne Forbes5695.47%
|
|Jeff Willerton (SoCred) 135213.00%|||
|Kenneth R. Kowalski
|-
|Bonnyville-Cold Lake|||
|Denis Ducharme5,64170.37%
|
|Ronald Young1,75521.89%
|
|Ellen Ulfsten3133.90%
|
|James William Skretteberg (Ind.)2753.43%|||
|Denis Ducharme
|-
|Calgary-Bow|||
|Alana S. DeLong8,27463.82%
|
|Kelly McDonnell3,23024.91%
|
|Jeff Bayliss8586.62%
|
|Margaret (Peggy) Askin (Ind.)1841.42%Jan Triska (Green)394
||
|Bonnie Laing
|-
|Calgary-Buffalo|||
|Harvey Cenaiko5,58253.92%
|
|Brian Edy4,13539.94%
|
|Neil McKinnon4734.57%
|
|Dave Schwartz (SoCred)1131.09%|||
|Gary Dickson
|-
|Calgary-Cross|||
|Yvonne Fritz6,81674.67%
|
|Keith Jones1,83620.11%
|
|Ramiro Mora4414.83%
|
||||
|Yvonne Fritz
|-
|Calgary-Currie|||
|Jon Lord6,92261.75%
|
|Pat Murray2,66723.79%
|
|Garth Mundle1,1149.94%
|
|J. Bruce Miller (Ind.)4343.87%|||
|Jocelyn Burgener
|-
|Calgary-East|||
|Moe Amery6,03870.32%
|
|Brendan Dunphy2,01023.41%
|
|Giorgio Cattabeni3283.82%
|
|Alan Schoonover (Ind.)1091.27%Jason Devine (Comm.)41
||
|Moe Amery
|-
|Calgary-Egmont|||
|Denis Herard10,33874.08%
|
|Wayne Lenhardt2,61318.72%
|
|Shawn Christie5674.06%
|
|Bradley R. Lang (Ind.)3992.86%|||
|Denis Herard
|-
|Calgary-Elbow|||
|Ralph Klein10,21366.68%
|
|Harold Swanson4,53329.59%
|
|Mathew Zachariah3692.41%
|
|Monier Rahall (Ind.)1661.08%|||
|Ralph Klein
|-
|Calgary-Fish Creek|||
|Heather Forsyth9,71674.39%
|
|Marc Doll2,85321.84%
|
|Ryan Todd4653.56%
|
||||
|Heather Forsyth
|-
|Calgary-Foothills|||
|Pat Nelson12,07067.21%
|
|Harry B. Chase5,05128.13%
|
|Jon Adams7844.37%
|
||||
|Patricia Black
|-
|Calgary-Fort|||
|Wayne Cao6,74068.29%
|
|Brian Huskins2,00420.30%
|
|Vinay Dey5015.08%
|
|Raymond (Chick) Hurst (SoCred)1601.62%Michael Alvarez-Toye (Green)1211.23%Metro Peter Demchynski (Ind.)1021.04%Brian Slater (Ind.)1001.02%Wyatt McIntyre (Ab. First)991.00%
||
|Wayne Cao
|-
|Calgary-Glenmore|||
|Ron Stevens9,67867.51%
|
|Michael Broadhurst3,70825.86%
|
|Jennifer Stewart4413.08%
|
| James S. Kohut (Green)4673.27%
||
|Ron Stevens
|-
|Calgary-Lougheed|||
|Marlene Graham8,95273.95%
|
|Pete Montgomery2,53820.97%
|
|Marc Power5774.77%
|
||||
|Marlene Graham
|-
|Calgary-McCall|||
|Shiraz Shariff6,55869.94%
|
|John Phillips2,08222.20%
|
|Preet Sihota4494.79%
|
|Darryl Elvers (Ab. First)1391.48%Rory M. Cory (SoCred)1211.29%|||
|Shiraz Shariff
|-
|Calgary-Montrose|||
|Hung Pham6,32970.35%
|
|Art Danielson2,09323.27%
|
|Robert Scobel5436.04%
|
||||
|Hung Pham
|-
|Calgary-Mountain View|||
|Mark Hlady6,46260.23%
|
|Jennifer Spencer2,61024.33%
|
|Keith Purdy1,63715.26%
|
||||
|Mark Hlady
|-
|Calgary-North Hill|||
|Richard Charles Magnus7,03463.60%
|
|Darryl G. Hawkins2,52922.87%
|
|Christine McGregor1,0679.65%
|
|Darcy Kraus (Ab. First)4043.65%|||
|Richard Charles Magnus
|-
|Calgary-North West|||
|Greg Melchin15,29271.38%
|
|Paul Allard4,97123.21%
|
|Patricia Alward8283.87%
|
|Douglas A. Picken (SoCred)2991.40%|||
|Greg Melchin
|-
|Calgary-Nose Creek|||
|Gary Mar11,99774.58%
|
|Peter Willott3,26320.28%
|
|Eileen Nesbitt7764.82%
|
||||
|Gary Mar
|-
|Calgary-Shaw|||
|Cindy Ady20,30680.60%
|
|Jim McPherson3,59514.27%
|
|Ryan Falkenberg7292.89%
|
|Peter Singleton (Ab. First)2220.88%Kevin Agar (Ind.)153>br/>0.61%Darren Popik (Ind.)1510.60%
||
|Jonathan Niles Havelock
|-
|Calgary-Varsity|||
|Murray D. Smith8,17359.14%
|
|Carrol Jaques3,93828.49%
|
|Susan Scott1,3099.47%
|
|Tavis Du Preez (Green)3342.90%
||
|Murray D. Smith
|-
|Calgary-West|||
|Karen Kryczka12,86672.92%
|
|Lorne B. Neudorf3,45919.60%
|
|Greg Klassen1,2637.16%
|
||||
|Karen Kryczka
|-
|Cardston-Taber-Warner|||
|Broyce G. Jacobs5,25653.58%
|
|Ron Hancock1,74717.81%
|
|Suzanne Sirias2402.45%
|
|John Reil (Ab. First)255726.07%|||
|Ron Hierath
|-
|Clover Bar-Fort Saskatchewan|||
|Rob Lougheed9,67462.59%
|
|W.H. (Skip) Gordon4,60629.80%
|
|Merrill Stewart1,1427.39%
|
||||
|Rob Lougheed
|-
|Cypress-Medicine Hat|||
|Lorne Taylor7,22272.71%
|
|Beverley Britton Clarke2,07420.88%
|
|Cliff Anten5986.02%
|
||||
|Lorne Taylor
|-
|Drayton Valley-Calmar|||
|Tony Abbott7,67368.29%
|
|Roger Coles2,22919.84%
|
|Mark Patty5885.23%
|
|Roger Stefura (Ind.)7296.49%|||
|Tom Thurber
|-
|Drumheller-Chinook|||
|Shirley McClellan6,68472.77%
|
|Greg Pyra0,92110.03%
|
|Gerry Hamilton5465.94%
|
|Eileen Walker (Ind.)8198.92%Peter Smits (SoCred)1842.00%|||
|Shirley McClellan
|-
|Dunvegan|||
|Hector G. Goudreau5,85767.02%
|
|Bruce Rutley1,88821.60%
|
|Yvonne Sinkevich5085.81%
|
|Ron (Earl) Miller (Ind.)2482.85%Fred Euler (Ind.)2082.39%
||
|Glen Clegg
|-
|Edmonton-Beverly-Clareview|||
|Julius E. Yankowsky4,73245.61%
|
|Bauni Mackay3,29031.71%
|
|Elisabeth Ballermann1,98519.13%
|
|Ken Shipka (Ind.)>br/>2112.04%Teo Zanetic (Ab. First)920.89%Tanya Gill (Ind.)560.54%
||
|Julius E. Yankowsky
|-
|Edmonton-Calder|||
|Brent Rathgeber5,12841.90%
|
|Lance D. White4,65438.03%
|
|Christine Burdett2,43219.87%
|
||||
|Lance D. White
|-
|Edmonton-Castle Downs|||
|Thomas A. Lukaszuk5,97151.03%
|
|Boris Yaremko4,47938.28%
|
|Michael Charrois1,23510.56%
|
||||
|Pamela Paul
|-
|Edmonton-Centre
|
|Don J. Weideman4,44638.16%|||
|Laurie Blakeman5,09543.73%
|
|David Eggen1,95916.82%
|
| Naomi J. Rankin (Comm.)760.66%
||
|Laurie Blakeman
|-
|Edmonton-Ellerslie
|
|Sukhi Randhawa4,20941.95%|||
|Debby Carlson4,48144.66%
|
|Deborah Morrison1,29912.95%
|
||||
|Debby Carlson
|-
|Edmonton-Glengarry
|
|Andrew Beniuk4,71544.85%|||
|Bill Bonner4,78445.51%
|
|Shane Watt1,0049.55%
|
||||
|Bill Bonner
|-
|Edmonton-Glenora|||
|Drew Hutton5,51545.57%
|
|Howard Sapers5,32844.03%
|
|Guy Desrosiers1,23210.18%
|
||||
|Howard Sapers
|-
|Edmonton-Gold Bar
|
|David Fletcher5,98139.85%|||
|Hugh MacDonald7,65451.00%
|
|Peter Cross1,1597.72%
|
|Margaret Marean (Green)1931.29%
||
|Hugh MacDonald
|-
|Edmonton-Highlands
|
|Robert Bilida3,47734.51%
|
|Kim Cassady1,92119.07%|||
|Brian Mason4,64146.07%
|
||||
|Brian Mason
|-
|Edmonton-Manning|||
|Tony Vandermeer5,90345.44%
|
|Ed Gibbons5,52342.51%
|
|Hana Razga1,53811.84%
|
||||
|Ed Gibbons
|-
|Edmonton-McClung|||
|Mark P. Norris6,97650.41%
|
|Nancy J. MacBeth5,92042.78%
|
|Lorne Dach8045.81%
|
|Patrick D. Ellis (Ind.)1330.96%|||
|Nancy J. MacBeth
|-
|Edmonton-Meadowlark|||
|Bob Maskell6,10848.50%
|
|Karen Leibovici5,67445.06%
|
|Mike Hudema6365.05%
|
|Peggy Morton (Ind.)1441.14%|||
|Karen Leibovici
|-
|Edmonton-Mill Creek|||
|Gene Zwozdesky8,08555.51%
|
|Bharat Agnihotri4,22929.04%
|
|Edwin Villania1,89313.00%
|
|Kyle Harvey (Ab. First)2201.51%Harlan Light (Green)970.67%
||
|Gene Zwozdesky
|-
|Edmonton-Mill Woods
|
|Carl Benito4,40243.69%|||
|Don Massey4,92048.83%
|
|Mel H. Buffalo7257.20%
|
||||
|Don Massey
|-
|Edmonton-Norwood|||
|Gary Masyk3,30438.06%
|
|Brian Bechtel3,16436.45%
|
|Harvey Voogd2,19625.30%
|
||||
|Sue Olsen
|-
|Edmonton-Riverview
|
|Wendy Kinsella5,88339.29%|||
|Kevin Taft7,42049.55%
|
|Doug McLachlan1,4699.81%
|
|Jerry Paschen (Green)1651.10%
||
|Linda Sloan
|-
|Edmonton-Rutherford|||
|Ian McClelland6,17348.08%
|
|Rick Miller5,55843.29%
|
|Shane MacDonald1,0718.34%
|
||||
|Percy Wickman
|-
|Edmonton-Strathcona
|
|John Logan4,74934.27%
|
|Jim Jacuta1,94414.03%|||
|Raj Pannu6,99850.50%
|
|James Lakinn (Ab. First)1360.98%|||
|Raj Pannu
|-
|Edmonton-Whitemud|||
|David Hancock10,88458.45%
|
|Bruce King6,50334.92%
|
|Katie Oppen Benschop1,1786.33%
|
||||
|David Hancock
|-
|Fort McMurray|||
|Guy C. Boutilier5,91464.36%
|
|John S. Vyboh1,75919.14%
|
|Lyn Gorman1,49816.30%
|
||||
|Guy C. Boutilier
|-
|Grande Prairie-Smoky|||
|Mel Knight6,24167.51%
|
|Barry Robinson1,77719.22%
|
|Leon R. Pendleton8429.11%
|
|Dennis Young (Ind.)3804.11%|||
|Walter Paszkowski
|-
|Grande Prairie-Wapiti|||
|Gordon J. Graydon5,67465.40%
|
|Ray Stitsen1,48917.16%
|
|Elroy Deimert8199.44%
|
|Ivo Noga (SoCred)4324.98%Terry Dueck (Ind.)136Robert Weberg (Ind.)1121.29%
||
|Wayne Jacques
|-
|Highwood|||
|Don Tannas13,32179.71%
|
|Leonard Borowski2,00011.97%
|
|Gunhild Hoogensen7734.63%
|
| Julie Walker (Green)5813.48%
||
|Don Tannas
|-
|Innisfail-Sylvan Lake|||
|Luke Ouellette9,72574.40%
|
|Garth E. Davis2,65220.29%
|
|Eileen Clancy Teslenko6514.98%
|
||||
|Gary Severtson
|-
|Lac La Biche-St. Paul|||
|Ray Danyluk5,33559.92%
|
|Vital Ouellette3,19535.88%
|
|John Williams3564.00%
|
||||
|Paul Langevin
|-
|Lacombe-Stettler|||
|Judy Gordon8,22170.00%
|
|Doug McDavid2,50021.29%
|
|Lorenzo Fiorito4553.87%
|
|Douglas R. Chitwood (Ind.)5544.72%|||
|Judy Gordon
|-
|Leduc|||
|Albert Klapstein9,23566.69%
|
|Joyce Assen3,57525.82%
|
|Leilani O'Malley9576.91%
|
||||
|Albert Klapstein
|-
|Lesser Slave Lake|||
|Pearl M. Calahasen4,76673.80%
|
|Rick Noel1,42922.13%
|
|Doris Bannister2323.59%
|
||||
|Pearl M. Calahasen
|-
|Lethbridge-East
|
|Ron Carroll4,70436.87%|||
|Ken Nicol6,93954.39%
|
|Gaye Metz5424.25%
|
|Mark Ogden (Ab. First)5544.34%|||
|Ken Nicol
|-
|Lethbridge-West|||
|Clint Dunford6,68547.97%
|
|Leslie Vaala5,49639.43%
|
|Mark Sandilands1,0627.62%
|
|Brian Stewart (Ab. First)6624.75%|||
|Clint Dunford
|-
|Little Bow|||
|Barry McFarland6,88164.70%
|
|Arij Langstraat2,53423.82%
|
|Andrea Enes3193.00%
|
|Jon Koch (Ind.)8858.32%|||
|Barry McFarland
|-
|Livingstone-Macleod|||
|David Coutts6,34060.47%
|
|Ernie Patterson3,03528.95%
|
|James Tweedie5535.27%
|
|Larry Lybbert (Ab. First)5194.95%|||
|David Coutts
|-
|Medicine Hat|||
|Rob Renner8,10961.80%
|
|Karen Charlton4,16631.75%
|
|Luke Lacasse7876.00%
|
||||
|Rob Renner
|-
|Olds-Didsbury-Three Hills|||
|Richard Marz10,55380.51%
|
|Gayleen Roelfsema1,66312.69%
|
|Brenda L. Dyck3832.92%
|
|Nicholas Semmler (SoCred)4603.51%|||
|Richard Marz
|-
|Peace River|||
|Gary Friedel3,78264.29%
|
|Susan Callihoo1,54426.25%
|
|Steve Crocker3385.75%
|
|John Iftody (Ab. First)2063.50%|||
|Gary Friedel
|-
|Ponoka-Rimbey|||
|Halvar C. Jonson6,79771.87%
|
|Tim Falkiner1,29613.70%
|
|Linda Roth5746.07%
|
|Charles Park (Ind.)7648.08%|||
|Halvar C. Jonson
|-
|Red Deer-North|||
|Mary Anne Jablonski5,02557.04%
|
|Norm McDougall3,11035.30%
|
|Jim Guthrie3093.51%
|
|Patti Argent (Ab. First)3564.04%|||
|Mary Anne Jablonski
|-
|Red Deer-South|||
|Victor Doerksen7,68459.93%
|
|Garfield Marks3,92730.63%
|
|Erika Bullwinkle5123.99%
|
|Bob Argent (Ab. First)4593.58%Ryan Lamarche (Ind.)2031.58%
||
|Victor Doerksen
|-
|Redwater|||
|Dave Broda7,31958.14%
|
|Andrew Raczynski3,92431.17%
|
|Mike Radojcic6585.23%
|
|Tony Ollenberger (Ab. First)6475.14%|||
|Dave Broda
|-
|Rocky Mountain House|||
|Ty Lund7,82070.27%
|
|Wijnand Horemans1,17110.52%
|
|Doug Mac Angus4083.67%
|
|Lavern J. Ahlstrom (SoCred)170515.32%|||
|Ty Lund
|-
|Sherwood Park|||
|Iris Evans13,24364.03%
|
|Louise Rogers5,78727.98%
|
|Chris Harwood1,6067.76%
|
||||
|Iris Evans
|-
|Spruce Grove-Sturgeon-St. Albert|||
|Doug Horner8,01055.23%
|
|Colleen Soetaert5,83240.22%
|
|Dale Apostal6164.25%
|
||||
|Colleen Soetaert
|-
|St. Albert|||
|Mary O'Neill9,53752.50%
|
|Len Bracko7,47941.17%
|
|Michelle Mungall1,1226.18%
|
||||
|Mary O'Neill
|-
|Stony Plain|||
|Stan Woloshyn9,19767.06%
|
|Monika Cappis3,22823.54%
|
|Stephen Lindop1,2619.19%
|
||||
|Stan Woloshyn
|-
|Strathmore-Brooks|||
|Lyle Oberg8,58574.92%
|
|Barry Morishita1,77415.48%
|
|Don MacFarlane2902.53%
|
|Christopher Sutherland (Ind.)5114.46%Rudy Martens (SoCred)2732.38%|||
|Lyle Oberg
|-
|Vegreville-Viking|||
|Ed Stelmach7,19160.63%
|
|Ross Demkiw3,39128.59%
|
|Greg Kurulok1,24310.48%
|
||||
|Ed Stelmach
|-
|Vermilion-Lloydminster|||
|Lloyd Snelgrove6,97873.01%
|
|David Tschorn0,98010.25%
|
|Raymond Stone97610.21%
|
|Grant West (Ab. First)5896.16%|||
|Steve West
|-
|Wainwright|||
|Robert A. (Butch) Fischer6,91063.53%
|
|Ronald Williams1,26911.67%
|
|Lilas I. Lysne4203.86%
|
|Jerry D. Barber (Ab. First)1,39412.82%Jeff Newland (Ind.)8687.98%
||
|Robert A. (Butch) Fischer
|-
|West Yellowhead|||
|Ivan J. Strang5,76359.10%
|
|Lyle Benson3,18032.61%
|
|Noel Lapierre8018.21%
|
||||
|Ivan J. Strang
|-
|Wetaskiwin-Camrose|||
|LeRoy Johnson9,09072.25%
|
|Stewart Larkin1,67113.28%
|
|Philip Penrod1,42011.29%
|
|Ben Lussier (Ind.)3823.04%|||
|LeRoy Johnson
|-
|Whitecourt-Ste. Anne|||
|George VanderBurg7,57968.41%
|
|Derril Butler2,89026.09%
|
|Wade Franko5705.15%
|
||||
|Peter Trynchy
|-
|}

References

Further reading

 

2001 elections in Canada
2001
2001 in Alberta
March 2001 events in Canada